Zhang Mengxue (born 6 February 1991) is a Chinese female sports shooter specialising in the 10 meter air pistol shooting. She won the gold medal in the 10 metres air pistol event at 2016 Summer Olympics.

Life
She trained at Jinan Sports School and Shandong Provincial Shooting Team before she was selected to join the China National Shooting Team in 2015. She won the gold medal in the women's 10 metre air pistol event at the 2016 Summer Olympics.

References

External links
 

1991 births
Living people
Sportspeople from Jinan
Sport shooters from Shandong
Chinese female sport shooters
Olympic shooters of China
Olympic medalists in shooting
Shooters at the 2016 Summer Olympics
2016 Olympic gold medalists for China